The 4th Michigan Infantry Regiment (Reorganized) was an infantry regiment that served in the Union Army during the American Civil War.

Service
The 4th Michigan Infantry was organized at Adrian and Grand Rapids, Michigan,  and mustered into Federal service October 14, 1864. The new regiment assumed the number of the original 4th Michigan that had been discharged at the completion of their enlistment on June 30, 1864.

The regiment was mustered out on June 10, 1865.

Total strength and casualties
The regiment suffered 7 enlisted men who were killed in action or mortally wounded and 141 enlisted men who died of disease, for a total of 148 
fatalities.

Commanders
Colonel Jairus William Hall

See also
List of Michigan Civil War Units
Michigan in the American Civil War

Notes

References
The Civil War Archive

Units and formations of the Union Army from Michigan
1865 disestablishments in Michigan
Military units and formations disestablished in 1865
1864 establishments in Michigan
Military units and formations established in 1864
Military units and formations disestablished in 1866